The 3rd Texas Infantry Regiment was a unit of volunteers recruited in Texas that fought in the Confederate States Army during the American Civil War. Surgeon Philip N. Luckett organized the regiment in summer 1861. The soldiers were recruited in central Texas and included significant numbers of German immigrants and Tejanos. Texans regarded Germans with suspicion, since many opposed slavery, while Tejanos were considered lazy and untrustworthy. Morale in the regiment was poor and the number of desertions was high. The unit garrisoned San Antonio in 1861 and 1862, before moving to Brownsville, Texas, in January 1863. The regiment traveled to Galveston in May 1863. The unit transferred to Arkansas in March 1864 where it joined William R. Scurry's 3rd Brigade in Walker's Texas Division. It fought at Jenkins' Ferry at the end of April 1864. The regiment marched to Hempstead, Texas, where it disbanded before the official surrender date of 26 May 1865.

See also
List of Texas Civil War Confederate units
Texas in the American Civil War

Notes

References

 

Units and formations of the Confederate States Army from Texas
1861 establishments in Texas
Military units and formations established in 1861
1865 disestablishments in Texas
Military units and formations disestablished in 1865